The Claude "Bud" Lewis Carlsbad Desalination Plant is a desalination plant in Carlsbad, California, north of the Encina Power Station. The San Diego County Water Authority (SDCWA), the recipient of the fresh water produced by the plant, calls it "the nation’s largest, most technologically advanced and energy-efficient seawater desalination plant." Opened on December 14, 2015, the entire desalination project cost about $1 billion for the plant, pipelines, and upgrades to existing SDCWA facilities to use the water.

History
The project to build a desalination plant in San Diego County, California commenced in 1993 after five years of drought. Membrane technology used in the plant was pioneered by General Atomics in La Jolla. Environmentalists opposed the construction due to various concerns, most notably energy consumption, brine discharge and that the ocean water intake could kill fish. Five lawsuits were brought against the plant, including by Surfrider Foundation, San Diego Coastkeeper, and the Coastal Environmental Rights Foundation, but none were successful.

Construction
The plant construction started in December 2012, and was originally scheduled to be completed in 2016. However, due to the continuing drought in California, plant completion was advanced to late 2015. The plant began regular operations in December 2015. It was named after former Carlsbad mayor, Claude "Bud" Lewis, who held the position for almost a quarter of a century. Lewis died in 2014 and was a supporter of construction of the desalination plant. After completion, it underwent six months of testing before being put online.

Pipeline construction began in 2013, and was completed June 28, 2015.

Poseidon Water built the plant. The main engineering companies on this project were GHD Group and U.S.-based Butier Engineering Inc. IDE Americas Inc., a subsidiary of Israel-based IDE Technologies, designed the plant. IDE Technologies is jointly owned by Delek Group and Israel Chemicals. Simon Wong Engineering was subcontracted to provide the design and structural engineering services. J.F. Shea Company and Kiewit Corporation constructed the plant.

The plant took nearly 14 years to permit, design, and build. The total project cost was expected to reach near $1 billion; initial cost estimates were a $250 million in 2004, to $690 million in 2010. The cost of construction was funded by bond sales. In late-2012, Fitch Ratings gave the bonds the lowest investment grade rating. Upon completion, it became the largest desalination plant in the Western Hemisphere.

Operations
In 2016, the plant fulfilled 95% of water orders. This reduced to 70% fulfillment of water orders in 2017. In December 2018, the plant produced its 40-billionth gallon of water; it can provide water for up to 400,000 people. In January 2019, a study was published which noted that the discharge from the plant has increased the salinity of water offshore, but it has not made significant changes to the organisms in the water. Although Poseidon sells desalination as a "climate-proof" way to get water, the Carlsbad plant had to shut down because of red tides, most recently in April 2020  for weeks and with a warmer climate, California is set to get more red tides.

How it works
The water intake is filtered through gravel, sand, and other media to greatly reduce particulates before going through reverse osmosis filtration. Half of the saltwater taken into the plant is converted into pure potable water and the rest is discharged as concentrated brine.

The outflow of the plant is put into the discharge from the Encina Power Plant for dilution, for a final salt concentration about 20% higher than seawater. Most desalination plants discharge water with about 50% extra salt, which can lead to dead spots in the ocean, because the super-saline brine doesn't mix well with seawater. The NRG Encina Power Station is expected to go offline in 2017, and Poseidon Water will then take over dredging responsibility for the Agua Hedionda Lagoon, taking over from NRG; without dredging at the mouth of the lagoon, it would revert to being a pre-1952 mudflat.

Environmental concerns

To offset environmental impacts,  of wetlands were built in San Diego Bay. Solar panels will be installed on the roof of the plant, and carbon emission offsets will be purchased.

San Diego Coastkeeper is suing the SDCWA over environmental concerns. On July 29, 2015 it argued in a hearing before Superior Court Judge Gregory Pollack that the Authority's long-term water plan (and specifically the Carlsbad desalination plant) violates the California Environmental Quality Act, specifically with respect to energy needs and the greenhouse gases associated with those. Coastkeeper is not opposed to desalination, but wants proper mitigation. The Authority says that these have been accounted for, and a mitigation plan has been put into place.

Water quantity and cost
The plant is expected to produce  of water per day with energy use of ~3.6 kWh for 1 m3 fresh water, or ~38 MW of average continuous power. Another estimate has the plant requiring 40 MW to operate, and a cost of $49 million to $59 million a year. It will provide about 7% of the potable water needs for the San Diego region.

The San Diego County Water Authority signed a contract with the plant operator to purchase a minimum 48,000 acre-feet per year of water, but it can also demand up to a maximum of 56,000 acre-feet per year. This is equivalent to 43 million gallons per day (mgd), or about 86% of the plant's output.

The cost of water from the plant will be $100 to $200 more per acre-foot than recycled water (approximately 0.045 cents per gallon), $1,000 to $1,100 more than reservoir water (approx. 0.32 cents per gallon), but $100 to $200 less than importing water from outside the county. As of April 2015, San Diego County imported 90% of its water. A conglomerate of California-based environmentalist groups, the Desal Response Group, claimed that the plant will cost San Diego County $108 million a year.

See also
Desalination facilities
Huntington Beach Desalination Plant

References

External links
San Diego County Water Authority — SDCWA official website
SDCWA's Carlsbad Desalination Plant fact sheet—an extensive, fact-filled PDF brochure by the SDCWA
IDE Technologies - Carlsbad Project-Company Website
Poseidon Water -- Carlsbad Project—company website

Desalination plants in the United States
Water supply infrastructure in California
Buildings and structures in San Diego County, California
Carlsbad, California
Environment of California
2015 establishments in California